York View is an unincorporated community in Gloucester County, Virginia, United States.

References

Unincorporated communities in Virginia
Unincorporated communities in Gloucester County, Virginia